Richard Chamberlain (born 1934) is an American actor.

Richard Chamberlain may also refer to:

Richard Chamberlain (MP for Calne) (fl. 1420), English politician
Richard Chamberlain (MP for Islington West) (1840–1899), British politician

See also  
 Richard Chamberlin (disambiguation)